Konevo or Konyovo is the name of several rural localities in Russia.

Modern localities
Konevo, Altai Krai, a selo in Podoynikovsky Selsoviet of Pankrushikhinsky District in Altai Krai; 
Konyovo, Arkhangelsk Oblast, a selo in Konevsky Selsoviet of Plesetsky District in Arkhangelsk Oblast
Konevo, Kaliningrad Oblast, a settlement in Krasnoyarsky Rural Okrug of Ozyorsky District in Kaliningrad Oblast
Konevo, Kemerovo Oblast, a selo in Konevskaya Rural Territory of Belovsky District in Kemerovo Oblast; 
Konevo (selo), Kostroma Oblast, a selo in Konevskoye Settlement of Sharyinsky District in Kostroma Oblast
Konevo (village), Kostroma Oblast, a village in Konevskoye Settlement of Sharyinsky District in Kostroma Oblast
Konevo, Kursk Oblast, a khutor in Nizhnemedveditsky Selsoviet of Kursky District in Kursk Oblast
Konevo, Balakhninsky District, Nizhny Novgorod Oblast, a village in Konevsky Selsoviet of Balakhninsky District in Nizhny Novgorod Oblast
Konevo, Kovriginsky Selsoviet, Gorodetsky District, Nizhny Novgorod Oblast, a village in Kovriginsky Selsoviet of Gorodetsky District in Nizhny Novgorod Oblast
Konevo, Smirkinsky Selsoviet, Gorodetsky District, Nizhny Novgorod Oblast, a village in Smirkinsky Selsoviet of Gorodetsky District in Nizhny Novgorod Oblast
Konevo, Krasnozyorsky District, Novosibirsk Oblast, a selo in Krasnozyorsky District of Novosibirsk Oblast
Konevo, Toguchinsky District, Novosibirsk Oblast, a village in Toguchinsky District of Novosibirsk Oblast
Konevo, Perm Krai, a village in Sivinsky District of Perm Krai
Konevo, Pskov Oblast, a village in Ostrovsky District of Pskov Oblast
Konevo, Artinsky District, Sverdlovsk Oblast, a village in Artinsky District of Sverdlovsk Oblast
Konevo, Nevyansky District, Sverdlovsk Oblast, a selo in Nevyansky District of Sverdlovsk Oblast
Konevo, Tver Oblast, a village in Botovskoye Rural Settlement of Ostashkovsky District in Tver Oblast
Konevo, Tyumen Oblast, a selo in Konevsky Rural Okrug of Abatsky District in Tyumen Oblast
Konevo, Kharovsky District, Vologda Oblast, a village in Kubinsky Selsoviet of Kharovsky District in Vologda Oblast
Konevo, Vashkinsky District, Vologda Oblast, a village in Roksomsky Selsoviet of Vashkinsky District in Vologda Oblast

Alternative names
Konevo, alternative name of Konevy, a village in Stulovsky Rural Okrug of Slobodskoy District in Kirov Oblast;